Rickshaw Mama is a 1992 Indian Tamil-language film directed by P. Vasu. The film stars Sathyaraj, Gouthami and Khushbu. It was released on 15 January 1992, and completed a 100-day run.

Plot 
Bhuvana, a lonely girl who is parent-less, longs for true love and parental care. Though Bhuvana is a granddaughter of a rich businessman, he has no time to spend time with the child. She wants to travel in the rickshaw along with other children and be with Raja aka Rickshaw Mama (Rickshaw Uncle), who takes of care of children with love. Bhuvana has an attempted kidnapping, and Raja saves her. Bhuvana is very adamant to go to school in the rickshaw, and her caretaker appoints Bhuvana to drop and pick her up from school. Initially, Raja wonders why is he appointed for pick-up and drop when Bhuvana is already rich enough. Later, he finds out that Bhuvana is longing for love and affection. He takes care of Bhuvana with full affection and care and looks after her like a father. Since Bhuvana is under his care, the kidnappers are not able to kidnap her. Raja brings home a woman who is very fond of him and starts loving him. However, she is jealous of Bhuvana and Raja's affection for her as she wanted him solely for herself. She drives away the child by saying that Raja will love and take care of his own child only rather than her. The child reaches homefalls unconscious, and her grandfather comes to visit the child. Raja finds the truth and rushes to see her in the hospital. The grandfather is shocked to see Raja and asks his men to drive him away, and Raja is injured. He also finds the truth that Bhuvana is his own daughter.

The flashback rolls to some years back, where Raja was doing a daily job of picking up a college-going girl Gauri to leave her at the college. Gauri, being the daughter of a rich man, was also kind to him. One day, she overhears her father's telephone conversation where her father plans to kill a man as he would be trapped for his crime if the man gives a true statement to police. Gauri begs her father not to do this, and her father promises her on seeing his daughter plead. However, the man is killed in an accident, and Gauri misunderstands that her father killed him as planned. She leaves her home as she did not want to be a daughter of a rich killer. Gauri goes to Raja and asks him to marry her. Initially, he hesitates as she is from a rich family and he is an ordinary man, but somehow she convinces him, and both get married. Gauri, who is now Raja's wife, leads a very happy life with him and gets pregnant. Raja arranges a bed in a big reputed hospital to admit his wife during her delivery, but he meets with an accident and requires a major operation, which costs a huge sum in the same hospital. Gauri goes to her father, who is a financial loan banker, and asks money to him not as his daughter, but as a wife of a poor rickshaw man. Gauri, however, repays the money through her husband's earnings. As days roll by, Gauri suffers labour pains, and her husband takes her to the hospital. Since the case is critical, the doctors suggest an operation. However, Raja refuses that no knife should touch his wife's body, being very ignorant about the medical condition and advancements. He leaves the hospital, but the case becomes very critical, which forces the doctor to perform a caesarian, but Gauri dies giving birth to a baby girl. Raja finds out about the need for a caesarian and permits it, but the doctor replies that Gauri is already dead, having given birth to a stillborn baby. Gauri's father takes away his granddaughter and never even lets Raja see his daughter's dead body.

After knowing the truth, the lady apologies for her shameful act to Raja. The rich man is blackmailed by some goons who threaten to kidnap his granddaughter, which they eventually do so one day. Raja rushes to save Bhuvana, who is trapped in a water tank which might kill her by drowning her in running water any time. He fights with the goons, saves Bhuvana, and reconciles with her and his father-in-law.

Cast 

Sathyaraj as Raja (Rickshaw Mama)
Gautami as Lakshmi
Khushbu as Gowri
Baby Sridevi as Bhuvana
Goundamani as Govindasamy
Vijayakumar as Sivaramakrishnan
Nagesh as Minister Duraisamy
Radha Ravi as Aravinth
Vennira Aadai Moorthy as Sachidanandam
Pandu
Gundu Kalyanam
Manimala Vennniradai Moorthy

Production 
Rickshaw Mama is the acting debut of Vijayakumar's daughter Sridevi.

Music 
The soundtrack was composed by Ilaiyaraaja. The lyrics were written by Vaali and Gangai Amaran.

Reception 
C. R. K. of Kalki likened the film to old wine in new bottle.

References

External links 
 

1990s Tamil-language films
1992 films
Films directed by P. Vasu
Films scored by Ilaiyaraaja